The 1948 Minnesota gubernatorial election took place on November 2, 1948. Republican Party of Minnesota candidate Luther Youngdahl defeated Minnesota Democratic–Farmer–Labor Party challenger Charles Halsted.

Results

See also
 List of Minnesota gubernatorial elections

External links
 http://www.sos.state.mn.us/home/index.asp?page=653
 http://www.sos.state.mn.us/home/index.asp?page=657

Gubernatorial
1948
Minnesota
November 1948 events in the United States